The 1904 Dartmouth football team was an American football team that represented Dartmouth College as an independent during the 1904 college football season. In its second season under head coach Fred Folsom, the team compiled a 7–0–1 record, shut out five of eight opponents, and outscored opponents by a total of 143 to 13. David Main was the team captain. The team played its home games at Alumni Oval in Hanover, New Hampshire.

Schedule

References

Dartmouth
Dartmouth Big Green football seasons
College football undefeated seasons
Dartmouth football